Anneloes van Veen (born 7 August 1990) is a Dutch competitive sailor. She competed at the 2016 Summer Olympics in Rio de Janeiro, in the women's 470 class.

References

External links

1990 births
Living people
Dutch female sailors (sport)
Olympic sailors of the Netherlands
Sailors at the 2016 Summer Olympics – 470